Calvin C. Newport (born 1982) is an American nonfiction author and associate professor of computer science at Georgetown University.

Background and education
Cal Newport was born June 23, 1982. He completed his undergraduate studies at Dartmouth College in 2004 and received a Ph.D. in computer science from Massachusetts Institute of Technology in 2009 under Nancy Lynch. He was a post-doctoral associate in the MIT computer science department from 2009-2011. His grandfather, John Newport, was a Baptist minister and theologian.

Career
Newport joined Georgetown University as an assistant professor of computer science in 2011 and was granted tenure in 2017. His work focuses on distributed algorithms in challenging networking scenarios and incorporates the study of communications systems in nature. Newport is currently Provost's Distinguished Associate Professor in the Department of Computer Science at Georgetown University and the author of eight books.

Attention Management 

Newport started the Study Hacks blog in 2007 where he writes about "how to perform productive, valuable and meaningful work in an increasingly distracted digital age".

Newport coined the term "deep work" in his book Deep Work: Rules for Focused Success in a Distracted World (2016), which refers to studying for focused chunks of time without distractions such as email and social media. He challenges the belief that participation in social media is important for career capital.

In 2017, he began advocating for "digital minimalism."

In 2021, he began referring to the role email and chat play in what he calls "the hyperactive hive mind".

Books 
How to Win at College (2005)
How to Become a Straight-A Student (2006)
How to Be a High-School Superstar (2010)
So Good They Can't Ignore You: Why Skills Trump Passion In The Quest For Work You Love (2012)
Deep Work: Rules for Focused Success in a Distracted World (2016)
Digital Minimalism: Choosing a Focused Life in a Noisy World (2019)
The Time-Block Planner (2020)
A World Without Email  (2021)

References

1982 births
21st-century American male writers
21st-century American non-fiction writers
American bloggers
American computer scientists
American self-help writers
Dartmouth College alumni
Georgetown University faculty
Living people
Massachusetts Institute of Technology alumni
American male non-fiction writers